Humberto Guerra Allison (born 1940), is a physician and scientist. He graduated from Universidad Peruana Cayetano Heredia (MD) and Baylor College of Medicine (PhD in Microbiology). With Hugo Lumbreras, he co-founded a Tropical Medicine Institute at Cayetano Heredia University, the Instituto de Medicina Tropical Alexander von Humboldt at Lima, Peru. Guerra later directed the Institute.

Guerra's research focuses on the pathogenesis and immunology of bacterial diseases including brucellosis, leishmania and tuberculosis. He is the head of the Clinical Microbiology Laboratory at the IMT AvH.j

Sources
The Peru Report's Guide to Top People in Peru. Vol 1, p 303, 1992

External links
Link to Pub Med list of publications

Peruvian scientists
Peruvian tropical physicians
1940 births
Living people
Baylor University alumni
Peruvian expatriates in the United States